Constantin Zahei (10 September 1903 – 1996) was a Romanian equestrian. He competed in the individual eventing at the 1936 Summer Olympics.

References

External links
 

1903 births
1996 deaths
Romanian male equestrians
Olympic equestrians of Romania
Equestrians at the 1936 Summer Olympics
Sportspeople from Sibiu